Sexy Girl may refer to: 
 "Sexy Girl" (Glenn Frey song) (1984)
 "Sexy Girl" (Sabrina song) (1986)
 "Sexy Girl" (Snow song) (1995)
 "Sexy Girl" (Heaven song) (2010)
 "Sexy Girl", original title for "SG" (song) by DJ Snake, Ozuna, Megan Thee Stallion and Lisa (2021)
 "Sexy Girl", a song by Dareysteel (2003)
 "Sexy Girl", a song by Mumzy Stranger from his 2008 mixtape
 Sexy Girl, the Italian release of the film Come Dance with Me! (1959)

See also
Sexy Lady (disambiguation)